Thomas Lester Tryon (January 14, 1926 – September 4, 1991) was an American actor and novelist. As an actor, he was billed as Tom Tryon and is best known for playing the title role in the film The Cardinal (1963), featured roles in the war films The Longest Day (1962) and In Harm's Way (1965), acting with John Wayne in both movies, and especially the Walt Disney television character Texas John Slaughter (1958–1961). Tryon later turned to the writing of prose fiction and screenplays, and wrote several successful science fiction, horror and mystery novels as Thomas Tryon.

Early life and education
Thomas Tryon was born on January 14, 1926, in Hartford, Connecticut, the son of Arthur Lane Tryon, a clothier and owner of Stackpole, Moore & Tryon (he is often erroneously identified as the son of silent screen actor Glenn Tryon). He served in the United States Navy in the Pacific from 1943 to 1946 during and after World War II.

Acting career

Broadway
Tryon appeared on stage in Wish You Were Here (1952), Cyrano de Bergerac (1953), and Richard III (1953).

Early appearances
Tryon appeared in The Way of the World (1955). He also guest-starred in 1955 as Antoine De More in the two-part episode "King of the Dakotas" of NBC's western anthology series Frontier.

Paramount
Tryon was signed to a long term contract to Paramount. His film debut was in The Scarlet Hour (1956) at Paramount, directed by Michael Curtiz. It was a crime drama about a man whose married lover persuades him to commit a robbery; Tryon was second billed. He was top billed in a low budget war film at Allied Artists, Screaming Eagles (1956), then supported Charlton Heston and Anne Baxter in Three Violent People (1956) at Paramount. He was announced for, but did not end up appearing in, Short Cut to Hell.

Tryon's work was mostly in TV, appearing in Jane Wyman Presents The Fireside Theatre, The 20th Century-Fox Hour, Playhouse 90 (an adaptation of Charley's Aunt), Zane Grey Theater, Studio 57, Matinee Theatre, and Lux Video Theatre. He had a support role in RKO's The Unholy Wife (1957) billed after Rod Steiger and Diana Dors. He had the lead in a low budget science fiction film at Paramount, I Married a Monster from Outer Space (1958). Tryon appeared in the lead in "The Mark Hanford Story" (February 26, 1958) on NBC's Wagon Train with Onslow Stevens and Kathleen Crowley.
His other television roles included The Restless Gun with John Payne, General Electric Theater, The Millionaire, The Big Valley, and The Joseph Cotten Show.

Texas John Slaughter
Tryon played Texas John Slaughter in a series of TV movies for Disney which ran from 1958 to 1961. The role was based on actual historical figure John Slaughter. He was considered but eventually passed over for the role of Janet Leigh's lover, Sam Loomis, in the classic thriller Psycho (1960); the role went to John Gavin.

20th Century Fox

Tryon starred in The Story of Ruth (1960) at 20th Century Fox. For that studio he appeared in Marines, Let's Go (1961). Disney borrowed him to star in a satire about the space age, Moon Pilot (1962). He was one of many names in The Longest Day (1962) at Fox. In 1962, Tryon was cast to play the role of Stephen Burkett ("Adam") in the unfinished Marilyn Monroe-Dean Martin comedy film, Something's Got to Give, directed by George Cukor, but lost that role after Monroe was fired from the movie; the picture was remade with Doris Day and James Garner as Move Over, Darling (1963) with Chuck Connors playing Tryon's part. Tryon guest starred on Dr. Kildare and The Virginian.

Otto Preminger
Tryon's greatest role was as an ambitious Catholic priest in The Cardinal (1963). The film was a box office hit and Tryon received a nomination for a Golden Globe Award for Best Actor – Motion Picture Drama. However, that honor barely compensated for the trauma and abuse he suffered at the hands of director Otto Preminger. 

"Finally, I was in a position of being able to pick my roles," said Tryon in 1986. "But I didn't like the movie. I didn't like me in the movie. To this day, I cannot look at that film. It's because of Preminger. He was a tyrant who ruled by terror. He tied me up in knots. He screamed at me. He called me names. He said I was lazy. He said I was a fool. He never cursed me. His insults were far more personal."
 
Tryon guest-starred on Kraft Suspense Theatre and then was reunited with Preminger in In Harm's Way (1965) starring John Wayne and Kirk Douglas.

He had the lead in The Glory Guys (1965) with Senta Berger and James Caan.

Later acting career
He was part of a live television performance of The Fall of the House of Usher. He also co-wrote a song, "I Wish I Was", which appeared on an obscure record by Dick Kallman, star of the short-lived 1965 television sitcom Hank. Other television roles include episodes of The Big Valley, Bob Hope Presents the Chrysler Theatre, and the 1967 TV movie remake Winchester '73 in which Tryon played James Stewart's original role with a supporting cast featuring Dan Duryea, John Drew Barrymore, Joan Blondell, John Dehner and Paul Fix. Tryon went to Australia for his final screen performance as the lead in Color Me Dead (1969), a remake of the noir classic D.O.A. (1950), which had slipped into public domain.

Writing career

Disillusioned with acting, Tryon retired from the profession in 1969 and began writing horror and mystery novels. He was successful, overcoming skepticism about a classically handsome movie star suddenly turning novelist. He also moved into film financing, being executive producer on Dalton Trumbo's Johnny Got His Gun (1971).

His best-known work is The Other (1971), about a boy whose evil twin brother may or may not be responsible for a series of deaths in a small rural community in the 1930s. He adapted his novel into a film released the following year that starred Diana Muldaur, Uta Hagen, and John Ritter. Harvest Home (1973), about the dark pagan rituals being practiced in a small New England town, was adapted as The Dark Secret of Harvest Home (1978), a television miniseries starring Bette Davis.

An extensive critical analysis of Tryon's horror novels can be found in S. T. Joshi's book The Modern Weird Tale (2001). His other books include Crowned Heads, a collection of novellas inspired by the legends of Hollywood. Tryon sold the film rights to Universal to make four films based on the novellas. The first of these novellas, Fedora, about a reclusive former film actress whose relationship with her plastic surgeon is similar to that between a drug addict and her pusher, was later converted to a feature film directed by Billy Wilder.

Other novellas in the collection were based on the murder of former silent screen star Ramón Novarro and on the quasi-Oedipal relationship between actor Clifton Webb and his mother. Lady (1974) concerns the friendship between an eight-year-old boy and a charming widow in 1930s New England and the secret he discovers about her. His novel The Night of the Moonbow (1989) tells the story of a boy driven to violent means by the constant harassment he receives at a boys summer camp. Night Magic, written in 1991, was posthumously published in 1995.

Personal life
In 1955, Tryon married Ann L. Noyes, the daughter of stockbroker Joseph Leo Lilienthal and his wife, the former Edna Arnstein. She was the former wife of Thomas Ewing Noyes, with whom she had been a theatrical producer. The Tryons divorced in 1958, and Ann Tryon resumed her previous married name. She died in 1966. Tryon said that she committed suicide and that he kept a photograph of her in his apartment.

During the 1970s, he was in a romantic relationship with Clive Clerk, one of the original cast members of A Chorus Line and an interior designer who decorated Tryon's apartment on Central Park West in New York City, which was featured in Architectural Digest. From 1973 to 1977, Tryon was in a relationship with porn actor Casey Donovan.

Death
Tryon died on September 4, 1991, at the age of 65 in Los Angeles, California. The announced cause of death was "stomach cancer". Tryon's literary executor, C. Thomas Holloway, later stated Tryon's stomach cancer was related to his HIV-positive status. Tryon asked to keep this information private. When Tryon's lover Clive Clerk explained, "Tom didn't want his readers or his relatives to know," Holloway disapproved, writing, "I see it as Tom's selfish silence helped the Dark Ages [of public acceptance of HIV/AIDS] continue into the millennium."

Filmography

Film

Television

Bibliography

Novels 
The Other (Knopf, 1971) 
 Harvest Home (Knopf, 1973) 
 Lady (Knopf, 1974) 
 The Night of the Moonbow (Knopf, 1989)  
 The Wings of the Morning (Knopf, 1990)  
 In the Fire of Spring (Knopf, 1992)  
 The Adventures of Opal and Cupid (Viking Press, 1992) 
 Night Magic (Simon & Schuster, 1995)

Collections 
 Crowned Heads (Knopf, 1976) 
 All That Glitters (Knopf, 1986)

Short stories and novellas 
 Bobbitt (1976)
 Fedora (1976)
 Lorna (1976)
 Willie (1976)

References

External links
https://www.findagrave.com/memorial/8460/tom-tryon

 

1926 births
1991 deaths
20th-century American male actors
20th-century American novelists
Male actors from New York (state)
American male film actors
American horror writers
American male novelists
United States Navy personnel of World War II
American LGBT military personnel
American mystery writers
American science fiction writers
American male screenwriters
American male stage actors
American male television actors
Deaths from cancer in California
Deaths from stomach cancer
American gay actors
American gay writers
American LGBT novelists
LGBT people from Connecticut
Male actors from Hartford, Connecticut
People from the Upper West Side
Writers from Hartford, Connecticut
20th-century American male writers
Novelists from New York (state)
Novelists from Connecticut
Screenwriters from New York (state)
Screenwriters from Connecticut
20th-century American screenwriters
AIDS-related deaths in California
20th-century LGBT people